is located in Nerima, Tokyo, Japan and dedicated to the life and works of Makino Tomitarō, "Father of Japanese Botany".

History
Makino Memorial Garden opened in 1958 on the site of Makino's former residence, where he lived from 1926 until his death in 1957. The gardens were closed for renovation in 2008 and reopened in 2010. In 2009 the gardens were registered as an Historic Site and Place of Scenic Beauty.

Gardens
The gardens contain over three hundred varieties of plants and trees, including the rare Sueko-zasa (bamboo), Sendaiya-zakura (cherry), and Heranoki. There are also seasonal plantings and a museum. They have an area of 2,576 square metres.

See also
 Parks and gardens in Tokyo
 Makino Botanical Garden

References

External links
  Makino Memorial Garden
 Profile of Makino Tomitarō

Parks and gardens in Tokyo
Museums in Tokyo
Nerima
Biographical museums in Japan
Registered Monuments of Japan
1958 establishments in Japan